YogaWorks offered yoga as therapy, teacher trainings, and sold yoga pants and accessories. In 2020, the company filed bankruptcy and sold its assets.

History

By 2008, the company had 21 yoga studios. 

In 2014, the company, which then had 29 yoga studios, was purchased by Great Hill Partners for $45 million.

In 2016, the company's studios had 3 million student visits.

In August 2017, the company became a public company via an initial public offering. At that time, it had 50 studios.

In November 2017, the company had 66 yoga studios in eight U.S. markets: Los Angeles, Orange County (California), New York City, Northern California, Boston, Baltimore/Washington D.C., Atlanta, and Houston.

In October 2019, Rosanna McCollough resigned as CEO of the company and Vance Chang resigned as CFO. Brian Cooper was appointed CEO.

On November 18, 2019, YogaWorks New York teachers voted 'yes' by an overwhelming majority to unionize, an initiative that was supported by Bernie Sanders, Chuck Schumer, and Elizabeth Warren.

In October 2020, during the height of the COVID-19 pandemic, the company filed bankruptcy and closed all of its locations.

Its assets were purchased by GoDigital Media Group for $9.6 million.

References

1987 establishments in California
Companies established in 1987
Yoga schools
2017 initial public offerings
Companies that filed for Chapter 11 bankruptcy in 2020